The 1842–43 United States House of Representatives elections were held on various dates in various states between August 1, 1842 and November 8, 1843. Each state set its own date for its elections to the House of Representatives before the first session of the 28th United States Congress convened on December 4, 1843. The exception was Maryland, who held theirs so late that they ran into February 1844. These elections occurred during President John Tyler's term. The congressional reapportionment based on the 1840 United States Census unusually decreased the number of House seats, from 242 down to 223.

After Whig President William Henry Harrison died within a month of taking office, his successor as president, John Tyler was only nominally a Whig who had not been properly validated for alignment to Whig policy. Effectively an independent, Tyler was disliked by politicians and was unpopular with voters of both parties, leaving the Whigs unexpectedly leaderless and in visible disarray.

Despite the improving economy, rural voters favored Democrats, again rejecting Whig economic nationalism. The Whig Party lost 69 seats and their sizeable majority from the 1840 election, almost half their House delegation (one of the Whigs who won re-election was William Wright of New Jersey, elected as an "Independent Whig" ).

The Democrats won a majority, flipping 48 Whig seats (this includes Henry Nes of Pennsylvania, elected as an Independent Democrat). In Rhode Island, the Law and Order Party, formed in response to the Dorr Rebellion, won two seats.

Apportionment Act of 1842 

Apportionment was based on the Census of 1840 and was unusual in that the number of House seats was decreased, from 242 to 223: this came after the Apportionment Act of 1842 mandated that all members be elected from single-member contiguous districts, thus abolishing plural districts and at-large districts. Four states that did not comply with this new law delayed redistricting under a grandfather clause.

Election summaries

Special elections

27th Congress 

|-
! 
| Robert C. Winthrop
|  | Whig
| 1840 
|  | Incumbent resigned May 25, 1842 due to the death of his wife.New member elected June 3, 1842.Whig hold.Successor would later resign and be replaced by his predecessor, see below.
| nowrap | 

|-
! 
| Nathan Appleton
|  | Whig
| 18301832 1842 
|  | Incumbent resigned September 28, 1842.New member elected November 14, 1842.Whig hold.Successor also elected the same day to the next term, see below.
| nowrap | 

|}

28th Congress 

|-
! 
| Barker Burnell
|  | Whig
| 1840
|  | Incumbent died June 15, 1843.New member elected November 13, 1843.Whig hold.Successor seated December 7, 1843.
| nowrap | 

|}

Alabama 

Alabama gained 2 seats, going from 5 to 7 members. Elections were held August 7, 1843, after the March 4, 1843 beginning of the term. In the 1841 elections, Alabama briefly used at-large general-ticket elections, but in these elections it returned to districts.

|-
! 
| Benjamin Glover Shields
|  | Democratic
| 1841
|  | Incumbent retired.New member elected.Whig gain.
| nowrap | 

|-
! 
| colspan=3 | New seat
|  | New seat.New member elected.Democratic gain.
| nowrap | 

|-
! 
| Dixon Hall Lewis
|  | Democratic
| 1829
|  | Incumbent re-elected.
| nowrap | 

|-
! 
| William Winter Payne
|  | Democratic
| 1841
|  | Incumbent re-elected.
| nowrap | 

|-
! 
| George S. Houston
|  | Democratic
| 1841
|  | Incumbent re-elected.
| nowrap | 

|-
! 
| Reuben Chapman
|  | Democratic
| 1835
|  | Incumbent re-elected.
| nowrap | 

|-
! 
| colspan=3 | Open seat
|  | New seat.New member elected.Democratic gain.
| nowrap | 

|}

Arkansas 

Arkansas stayed at 1 seat, electing its one member at-large October 3, 1842.

|-
! 
| Edward Cross
|  | Democratic
| 1838
| Incumbent re-elected.
| nowrap | 

|}

Connecticut 

Connecticut lost 2 seats, reduced from 6 to 4 members. Elections were held April 5, 1843, after the March 4, 1843 beginning of the term, but before the House first convened in December 1843.

|-
! rowspan=2 | 
| Joseph Trumbull
|  | Whig
| 1834 1835 1839
|  | Incumbent retired.New member elected.Democratic gain.
| rowspan=2 nowrap | 

|-
| John H. Brockway
|  | Whig
| 1839
|  | Incumbent retired.Whig loss.

|-
! 
| William Boardman
|  | Whig
| 1840 
|  | Incumbent retired.New member elected.Democratic gain.
| nowrap | 

|-
! rowspan=2 | 
| Thomas W. Williams
|  | Whig
| 1839
|  | Incumbent retired.New member elected.Democratic gain.
| rowspan=2 nowrap | 

|-
| Truman Smith
|  | Whig
| 1839
|  | Incumbent retired.Whig loss.

|-
! 
| Thomas B. Osborne
|  | Whig
| 1839
|  | Incumbent lost re-election.New member elected.Democratic gain.
| nowrap | 

|}

Delaware 

Delaware stayed at 1 seat, electing its one member at-large November 8, 1842.

The election was decided by a nine-vote margin.

|-
! 
| George B. Rodney
|  | Whig
| 1840
| Incumbent re-elected.
| nowrap | 

|}

Florida Territory 
See Non-voting delegates, below.

Georgia 

Georgia lost 1 seat, going from 9 to 8 members. Elections were held at-large on a general ticket October 3, 1842.

|-
! rowspan=8 | 
| Mark A. Cooper
|  | Democratic
| 1841 
| Incumbent re-elected.
| rowspan=8 nowrap | 

|-
| Thomas F. Foster
|  | Whig
| 18281834 1840
|  | Incumbent retired.New member elected.Democratic gain.

|-
| Thomas B. King
|  | Whig
| 1838
|  | Incumbent lost re-election.New member elected.Democratic gain.

|-
| Roger L. Gamble
|  | Whig
| 1838
|  | Incumbent lost re-election.New member elected.Democratic gain.

|-
| James A. Meriwether
|  | Whig
| 1840
|  | Incumbent retired.New member elected.Democratic gain.

|-
| Richard W. Habersham
|  | Whig
| 1838
|  | Incumbent lost re-election.New member elected.Democratic gain.Incumbent died December 2, 1842, leading to a special election.

|-
| Edward J. Black
|  | Democratic
| 18381840 1841 
| Incumbent re-elected.

|-
| Walter T. Colquitt
|  | Democratic
| 1841 
|  | Incumbent retired.New member elected.Democratic hold.

|}

Illinois 

Illinois gained 4 seats, going from 3 to 7 members. Elections were held August 7, 1842.

|-
! 

|-
! 

|-
! 

|-
! 

|-
! 

|-
! 

|-
! 

|}

Indiana 

Indiana gained 3 seats, going from 7 to 10 members. Elections were held August 7, 1843, after the March 4, 1843 beginning of the term.

|-
! 

|-
! 

|-
! 

|-
! 

|-
! 

|-
! 

|-
! 

|-
! 

|-
! 

|-
! 

|}

Kentucky 

Kentucky lost 3 seats, going from 13 to 10 members. Elections were held August 7, 1843, after the March 4, 1843 beginning of the term.

|-
! 

|-
! 

|-
! 

|-
! 

|-
! 

|-
! 

|-
! 

|-
! 

|-
! 

|-
! 

|}

Louisiana 

Louisiana gained 1 seats, going from 3 to 4 members. Elections were held July 3–5, 1843, after the March 4, 1843 beginning of the term.

|-
! 

|-
! 

|-
! 

|-
! 

|}

Maine 

Maine lost 1 seat, going from 8 to 7 members. Elections were held September 11, 1843, after the March 4, 1843 beginning of the term.

|-
! 

|-
! 

|-
! 

|-
! 

|-
! 

|-
! 

|-
! 

|}

Maryland 

Maryland lost 2 seats, going from 8 to 6 members. Elections were held February 14, 1844, after the March 4, 1843 beginning of the term.

Maryland's elections to the next Congress were held February 14, 1844, after the 1842–1843 election cycle was passed and almost after the next Congress completed.

Massachusetts 

Massachusetts lost 2 seats, going from 12 to 10 members. Elections were held November 14, 1842, but some districts' elections stretched to multiple ballots into 1843 and very early 1844.

|-
! 
| Nathan Appleton
|  | Whig
| 18301833 1842 
|  | Incumbent resigned September 28, 1842.New member elected.Whig hold.Successor also elected the same day to finish the current term, see above.
| nowrap | 

|-
! 
| Leverett Saltonstall I
|  | Whig
| 1838
|  | Incumbent lost re-election.New member elected on the fourth ballot.Whig hold.
| nowrap | 

|-
! 
| Caleb Cushing
|  | Whig
| 1834
|  | Incumbent retired.New member elected on the seventh ballot.Whig hold.
| nowrap | 

|-
! 
| William Parmenter
|  | Democratic
| 1836
| Incumbent re-elected on the second ballot.
| nowrap | 

|-
! 
| Charles Hudson
|  | Whig
| 1841 
| Incumbent re-elected on the third ballot.
| nowrap | 

|-
! 
| Osmyn Baker
|  | Whig
| 1839 
| Incumbent re-elected on the sixth ballot.
| nowrap | 

|-
! 
| George N. Briggs
|  | Whig
| 1833
|  | Incumbent retired.New member elected on the sixth ballot.Whig hold.
| nowrap | 

|-
! 
| John Quincy Adams
|  | Whig
| 1830
| Incumbent re-elected.
| nowrap | 

|-
! 
| Nathaniel B. Borden
|  | Democratic
| 18341838 (Lost)1841
|  | Incumbent retired.New member elected.Democratic hold.
| nowrap | 

|-
! 
| Barker Burnell
|  | Whig
| 1840
| Incumbent re-elected.
| nowrap | 

|}

Michigan 

Michigan gained 2 seats, going from 1 to 3 members. Elections were held from districts November 8, 1843, after the March 4, 1843 beginning of the term, having previously elected a single member at-large.

|-
! 
| Jacob M. Howard
|  | Whig
| 1840
|  | Incumbent lost re-election.New member elected.Democratic gain.
| nowrap | 

|-
! 
| colspan=3 | None 
|  | New seat.New member elected.Democratic gain.
| nowrap | 

|-
! 
| colspan=3 | None 
|  | New seat.New member elected.Democratic gain.
| nowrap | 

|}

Mississippi 

Mississippi gained 2 seats, going from 2 to 4 members. Elections were held at-large on a general ticket November 6–7, 1843, after the March 4, 1843 beginning of the term. Due to a banking crisis in Mississippi, the state Democratic party was split into two factions; the Redemptions, which favored the repudiation of bank bonds, and Anti-Redemptions, which opposed it.

|-
! rowspan=4 | (4 seats)
| Jacob Thompson
|  | Democratic
| 1839
| Incumbent re-elected.
| nowrap rowspan=4 | 
|-
| William M. Gwin
|  | Democratic
| 1841
|  | Incumbent retired.New member elected.Democratic hold.
|-
| colspan=3 | None (new district)
|  | New member elected.Democratic gain.
|-
| colspan=3 | None (new district)
|  | New member elected.Democratic gain.
|}

Missouri 

Missouri gained 3 seats, going from 2 to 5 members. Elections were held at-large on a general ticket August 1, 1842.

|-
! rowspan=5 | 
| 
| 
| 
| 
| rowspan=5 nowrap | 

|-
| 
| 
| 
|
|-
| 
| 
| 
|
|-
| 
| 
| 
|
|-
| 
| 
| 
|
|}

New Hampshire 

New Hampshire lost 1 seat, going from 5 to 4 members. Elections were held at-large on a general ticket March 3, 1843.

|-
! rowspan=4 | 
|
|-
|
|-
|
|-
|
|}

New Jersey 

New Jersey lost 1 seats, going from 6 to 5 members. Elections were held from districts October 8, 1842, having previously elected them at-large.

|-
! 
| Joseph Fitz Randolph
|  | Whig
| 1836
|  | Incumbent retired.New member elected.Democratic gain.
| nowrap | 

|-
! 
| John B. Aycrigg
|  | Whig
| 18361838 1840
|  | Incumbent retired.New member elected.Democratic gain.
| nowrap | 

|-
! 
| William Halstead
|  | Whig
| 18361838 1840
|  | Unknown if incumbent retired or lost.New member elected.Democratic gain.
| nowrap | 

|-
! 
| John Patterson Bryan Maxwell
|  | Whig
| 18361838 1840
|  | Unknown if incumbent retired or lost.New member elected.Democratic gain.
| nowrap | 

|-
! rowspan=2 | 
| Charles C. Stratton
|  | Whig
| 18361838 1840
|  | Incumbent retired.New member elected.Whig hold.
| rowspan=2 nowrap | 

|-
| Thomas Jones Yorke
|  | Whig
| 18361838 1840
|  | Unknown if incumbent retired or lost.Whig loss.

|}

New York 

New York lost 6 seats, going from 40 to 34 members, but remaining the largest delegation. Its thirty-four members were elected November 8, 1842.

|-
! 

|-
! 

|-
! 

|-
! 

|-
! 

|-
! 

|-
! 

|-
! 

|-
! 

|-
! 

|-
! 

|-
! 

|-
! 

|-
! 

|-
! 

|-
! 

|-
! 

|-
! 

|-
! 

|-
! 

|-
! 

|-
! 

|-
! 

|-
! 

|-
! 

|-
! 

|-
! 

|-
! 

|-
! 

|-
! 

|-
! 

|-
! 

|-
! 

|-
! 

|}

North Carolina 

North Carolina lost 4 seats, going from 13 to 9 members. Elections were held August 3, 1843, after the March 4, 1843 beginning of the term.

|-
! 

|-
! 

|-
! 

|-
! 

|-
! 

|-
! 

|-
! 

|-
! 

|-
! 

|}

Ohio 

Ohio gained 2 seats, going from 19 to 21 members. Its twenty-one members were elected October 10, 1843, after the March 4, 1843 beginning of the term.

|-
! 

|-
! 

|-
! 

|-
! 

|-
! 

|-
! 

|-
! 

|-
! 

|-
! 

|-
! 

|-
! 

|-
! 

|-
! 

|-
! 

|-
! 

|-
! 

|-
! 

|-
! 

|-
! 

|-
! 

|-
! 

|}

Pennsylvania 

Pennsylvania lost 4 seats, going from 28 to 24 members. Its twenty-four members were elected October 10, 1843, after the March 4, 1843 beginning of the term.

|-
! 

|-
! 

|-
! 

|-
! 

|-
! 

|-
! 

|-
! 

|-
! 

|-
! 

|-
! 

|-
! 

|-
! 

|-
! 

|-
! 

|-
! 

|-
! 

|-
! 

|-
! 

|-
! 

|-
! 

|-
! 

|-
! 

|-
! 

|-
! 

|}

Rhode Island 

Rhode Island stayed at 2 seats, but elected its members from districts, having previously elected them at-large. Elections were held August 29, 1843, after the March 4, 1843 beginning of the term.

|-
! 
| Robert B. Cranston
|  | Whig
| 1837
|  | Unknown if incumbent retired or lost re-election.New member elected.Law and Order gain.
| nowrap | 

|-
! 
| Joseph L. Tillinghast
|  | Whig
| 1837
|  | Incumbent retired.New member elected.Law and Order gain.
| nowrap | 

|}

South Carolina 

South Carolina lost 2 seats, going from 9 to 7 members. Elections were held February 20–21, 1843.

|-
! 

|-
! 

|-
! 

|-
! 

|-
! 

|-
! 

|-
! 

|}

Tennessee 

Tennessee lost 2 seats, going from 13 to 11 members. Elections were held August 3, 1842.

|-
! 
| Thomas D. Arnold
|  | Whig
| 1841
|  |Incumbent retired.New member elected.Democratic gain.
| nowrap | 

|-
! 
| Abraham McClellan
|  | Democratic
| 1837
|  |Incumbent retired.New member elected.Whig gain.
| nowrap | 

|-
! rowspan=2 | 
| Joseph L. Williams
|  | Whig
| 1837
|  |Incumbent lost renomination.New member elected.Democratic gain.
| rowspan=2 nowrap | 
|-
| Thomas J. Campbell
|  | Whig
| 1841

|-
! 
| Thomas J. Campbell
|  | Whig
| 1841
|  |Incumbent redistricted to the .New member elected.Democratic gain.
| nowrap | 

|-
! 
| Hopkins L. Turney
|  | Democratic
| 1837
|  |Incumbent retired.New member elected.Democratic hold.
| nowrap | 

|-
! rowspan=2 | 
| William B. Campbell
|  | Whig
| 1837
|  |Incumbent retired.New member elected.Democratic gain.
| nowrap rowspan=2 | 
|-
| Aaron V. Brown
|  | Democratic
| 1839

|-
! 
| Robert L. Caruthers
|  | Whig
| 1841
|  |Incumbent retired.New member elected.Whig hold.
| nowrap | 

|-
! 
| Meredith P. Gentry
|  | Whig
| 1839
|  |Incumbent retired.New member elected.Whig hold.
| nowrap | 

|-
! rowspan=2 | 
| Harvey M. Watterson
|  | Democratic
| 1839 
|  |Incumbent retired.New member elected.Democratic hold.
| nowrap rowspan=2 | 
|-
| Cave Johnson
|  | Democratic
| 1839 

|-
! 
| Aaron V. Brown
|  | Democratic
| 1839
|  |Incumbent redistricted to the .New member elected.Whig gain.
| nowrap | 

|-
! rowspan=2 | 
| Cave Johnson
|  | Democratic
| 1839 
|  |Incumbent redistricted to the .New member elected.Whig gain.
| rowspan=2 nowrap | 
|-
| Milton Brown
|  | Whig
| 1841 

|}

Vermont 

Vermont lost 1 seat, going from 5 to 4 members. Elections were held September 5, 1843, after the March 4, 1843 beginning of the term.

|-
! 

|-
! 

|-
! 

|-
! 

|}

Virginia 

Virginia lost 6 seats, going from 21 to 15 members. Elections were held April 27, 1843, after the March 4, 1843 beginning of the term.

|-
! 

|-
! 

|-
! 

|-
! 

|-
! 

|-
! 

|-
! 

|-
! 

|-
! 

|-
! 

|-
! 

|-
! 

|-
! 

|-
! 

|-
! 

|}

Wisconsin Territory 
See Non-voting delegates, below.

Non-voting delegates 

|-
! 
| David Levy Yulee
|  | Democratic
| 1840
| Incumbent re-elected.
| nowrap | 

|-
! 
| Augustus C. Dodge
|  | Democratic
| 1840
| Incumbent re-elected.
| nowrap | 

|-
! 

|}

See also 
 1842 United States elections
 1842–43 United States Senate elections
 27th United States Congress
 28th United States Congress

Notes

References

Bibliography

External links 
 Office of the Historian (Office of Art & Archives, Office of the Clerk, U.S. House of Representatives)